Marcello Stefanini (11 January 1938 – 29 December 1994) was an Italian politician who served as Mayor of Pesaro (1970–1978), Deputy (1987–1992), and Senator (1992–1994).

References

1938 births
1994 deaths
Italian Communist Party politicians
Democratic Party of the Left politicians
Deputies of Legislature X of Italy
Mayors of Pesaro
Senators of Legislature XI of Italy